Uromyces is a genus of rust fungi in the family Pucciniaceae. The genus was described by Franz Unger in his 1833 work Die Exantheme der Pflanzen. They have a worldwide distribution but large occurrences happen in North America and Europe.

Species 
Species in the genus Uromyces include:
 Uromyces apiosporus
 Uromyces appendiculatus
 Uromyces beticola
 Uromyces ciceris-arietini
 Uromyces dianthi
 Uromyces elegans
 Uromyces euphorbiae
 Uromyces graminis
 Uromyces inconspicuus
 Uromyces lineolatus subsp. nearcticus
 Uromyces medicaginis
 Uromyces musae
 Uromyces oblongus
 Uromyces pisi-sativi - synonym: Uromyces pisi
 Uromyces proeminens var. poinsettiae
 Uromyces trifolii-repentis var. fallens
 Uromyces viciae-fabae var. viciae-fabae
 Uromyces vignae

References

External links 
 Species Profile - Gladiolus Rust (Uromyces transversalis), National Invasive Species Information Center, United States National Agricultural Library. Lists general information and resources for Gladiolus Rust.

 
Fungal plant pathogens and diseases
Basidiomycota genera